Isaak Izrailevich Brodsky ( – 14 August 1939) was a Soviet painter whose work provided a blueprint for the art movement of socialist realism. He is known for his iconic portrayals of Lenin and idealized, carefully crafted paintings dedicated to the events of the Russian Civil War and Bolshevik Revolution.

Life and career
Brodsky was born in the village of Sofiyivka near Berdyansk in what is now Ukraine to Yisrael, a Jewish merchant. He studied at Odessa Art Academy and the Imperial Academy of Arts in Saint Petersburg. In 1916, he joined the Jewish Society for the Encouragement of the Arts. When Brodsky asked Lenin to autograph his painting Lenin, he said: "I am signing to what I don't agree with for the first time".

Brodsky was on good terms with many leading Russian painters, including his mentor, Ilya Repin. He was an avid art collector who donated numerous first-class paintings to museums in his native Ukraine and elsewhere. His superb art collection included important works by Repin, Vasily Surikov, Valentin Serov, Isaak Levitan, Mikhail Vrubel, and Boris Kustodiev. After his death Brodsky's apartment on Arts Square in St. Petersburg was declared a national museum. His art collection is still on exhibit there.

Brodsky was an Honoured Artist of the Russian SFSR and a member of the Union of Russian Artists. He was the first painter to be awarded the Order of Lenin. In 1934, he was appointed Director of the All-Russian Academy of Arts. From 1934 to 1939 he was also a head of personal Art workshop in institute, where his pupils included the well-known Soviet painters Nikolai Timkov, Alexander Laktionov, Yuri Neprintsev, Piotr Belousov, Piotr Vasiliev, Mikhail Kozell and others.  He died in Leningrad in 1939. His memoirs were published posthumously.

Gallery

See also 
 Fine Art of Leningrad

References

Sources 
 Sergei V. Ivanov.  Unknown Socialist Realism. The Leningrad School. Saint Petersburg: NP - Print, 2007. P. 450.

External links

1884 births
1939 deaths
People from Zaporizhzhia Oblast
People from Berdyansky Uyezd
Ukrainian Jews
Soviet painters
Socialist realist artists
20th-century Russian painters
Russian male painters
Ukrainian male painters
Leningrad School artists
Jewish painters
Ukrainian art collectors
20th-century Ukrainian painters
20th-century Ukrainian male artists
Jewish art collectors
Jewish socialists
Recipients of the Order of Lenin